Ishimura may refer to:

People with the surname Ishimura
Maiha Ishimura
Tomoko Ishimura

In fiction
USG Ishimura, a space ship from the video game Dead Space
A town named Ishimura appears in the episode of Gargoyles, "Bushido," which is one of the few remaining places where gargoyles exist.

Japanese-language surnames